Pokhraira is a village in Bokhra block of Sitamarhi District in Bihar state of India. It is surrounded by three main cities of Bihar, which are Muzaffarpur, Darbhanga and Sitamarhi. Pokhraira is 27 km distance from district main city Sitamarhi and 97 km distance from state capital Patna.

History 
A village which is a centre not only for education but also for years long culture and civilization. A small remote village of North Bihar produced numbers of scholars spread all across the country. This village is also known due to some famous Zamindars.

Pokhraira is also known as Pokhraira Sharif in respect of Sufi saints. One of the famous spiritual persons was Maulana Abdur Rehman whose mazar is situated here.  He is also known as Sarkar Mohibba which was named by Aala Hazrat. Another Sufi Pir Sayyed Abu Nasar Hamdullah Kamaluddeen  who came here from North Western part of British India and lived here for some time. He spiritually influenced many persons and some of them are famous in this whole region. Bihar State prayer song has been written by M.R. Chisty who is from this village.
Mustafa Raza (Shabnam Kamali) was also a famous poet from this village. Similarly, there is a long list of people from this village who are making their village and district proud.There is a very famous phrase uses to indicate Pokhraira "A village where the hen is also educated".

Education 
This village is known due to active presence in the field of education . There are numbers of Government school, Private school and Religious school(Madrasa) present here. There is also a government girls school which were earlier known as Pardanashin Urdu Maktab

Government School
 Urdu Primary Girls School, (Phoolwari Mohalla)
 Urdu Primary School, (Noori Mohalla)
 Primary School Mushari Tola, (Raza Nagar)
 Middle School Shah Tola, (Phoolwari Mohalla)

Private School
 Ideal Kinder Garten, (Kamali Mohalla)
 Shabnam Academy, (Kamali Mohalla)
 S.M. Public School, (Madrasah Mohalla)
 M.N. Public School, (Noori Mohalla) 

Religious School/Madrasah
 Madrasah Noorul Hoda
 Madrasah Rahmania
 Madrasah Hamdia
 Madrasah Jamiatul Binat al Islamia

Trust and Organizations 
 Hamdi Educational Trust. (Running in the Memory of Zafar-E-Millat Allama Zafrul Hussain Hamdi Zafar Qadri) 
 S.M. Foundation (Running in the Memory of Sarkar Abdur Rahman Mohibba)  
 Bazm-E-Kamal (Religious Organization)

Mosques/Masajid 
 Jama Masjid   (Kamali Mohalla)
 Kamal Masjid  (Kamal Chowk)
 Phoolwari Masjid (Phoolwari Mohalla)
 Noori Masjid  (Noori Mohalla)
 Raza Masjid   (Raza Nagar)
 Rahmani Masjid (Madarsa Mohalla)
 Aulia Masjid  (Madarsa Mohalla)
 Shahi Masjid  (Sah Mohalla)

Transportation 
Pokhraira is about 2 km from State Highway and 11 km from National Highway NH 77. This village has seen road development very earlier. There is a main road and a bridge which were constructed during British Raj. This village is well connected by three of its nearest main cities by roadway. Every day 4 to 5 buses depart from Pokhraira Panchayat to Muzaffarpur, Darbhanga and Sitamarhi.

Nearest Railway Station- Janakpur Road (Pupri) 16km 
Nearest Airport- Darbhanga Airport  56km

Health Care 
There are many clinics present in Pokhraira. There is a Unani Hospital in this village and it is one of the oldest government hospital in the whole region. The foundation of this hospital were laid by the Haji Mohammad Taslim, a Zamindar of this village who donated the land for this Hospital. This hospital provide Unani Medicine free of cost to the patient.

Demographic 
According to the 2011 Indian census the population of Pokhraira is 5716 in which the percentage of male is 51.83% and the female is 48.17%. The gender ratio of this village is 930 female per 1000 male. The 95% population is Muslim and remaining is the lower cast of Hindu.
The recent local data shows the population is above the 8000 and the literacy rate is above 84%.

References

External links 
Census of India Website : Office of the Registrar General & Census Commissioner, India
Village Website In India, Explore Villages of India, Best Village Sites In India, Wikivillage

Villages in Sitamarhi district